Emsdetten (Westphalian: Detten) is a town in the district of Steinfurt, in North Rhine-Westphalia, Germany.

Geography

Neighbouring places

 Rheine
 Hörstel
 Saerbeck
 Greven
 Nordwalde
 Steinfurt
 Neuenkirchen

Division of the town
Emsdetten consists of 8 districts:

 Emsdetten
 Ahlintel
 Austum
 Hembergen
 Hollingen
 Isendorf
 Sinningen
 Westum

2006 school shooting

On 20 November 2006, 18-year-old former student Bastian Bosse entered the Geschwister Scholl School, fired several shots and set off smoke grenades. He injured 22 people before killing himself by a shot into the mouth. Even though there were no other fatalities, the shooting was considered the deadliest school shooting in the history of Germany since the Erfurt massacre; this position is now held by the Winnenden school shooting.

Twin towns – sister cities

Emsdetten is twinned with:
 Chojnice, Poland
 Hengelo, Netherlands

Notable people
 Walt Tkaczuk (born 1947), ice hockey player, first German born player in the National Hockey League
 Kathrin Vogler (born 1963), politician, MdB
 Atze Schröder (born 1965), comedian
 Norbert Krüler (born 1957), musician
 Valerie Niehaus (born 1974), actress
Christina Schulze-Föcking (born 1976), politician, MdL NRW
 Tim Wieskötter (born 1979), sprint canoeist, Olympic winner
 Lutz Altepost (born 1981), sprint canoeist, Olympic medalist and world champion
 Benjamin Behrla (born 1985), judoka
 Sebastian Sebastian Bosse (29 April 1988 – 20 November 2006) Perpetrator of the Emsdetten Emsdetten school shooting

Gallery

References

External links

 

Towns in North Rhine-Westphalia
Steinfurt (district)